ODL may refer to:

 Observations of daily living, cues that people attend to in the course of their everyday life, that inform them about their health
 Oklahoma Department of Libraries, the state library for the U.S. state of Oklahoma
 Open and distance learning, gratis distance education
 Ordnance Datum Liverpool, an ordnance datum recorded at Victoria Dock in Liverpool, England
 OpenDaylight Project, an software-defined networking (SDN) controller